In chemistry, a nitride is an inorganic compound of nitrogen. The "nitride" anion, N3- ion, is very elusive but compounds of nitride are numerous, although rarely naturally occurring. Some nitrides have a find applications, such as wear-resistant coatings (e.g., titanium nitride, TiN), hard ceramic materials (e.g., silicon nitride, Si3N4), and semiconductors (e.g., gallium nitride, GaN). The development of GaN-based light emitting diodes was recognized by the 2014  Nobel Prize in Physics. Metal nitrido complexes are also common.

Synthesis of inorganic metal nitrides is challenging because nitrogen gas (N2) is not very reactive at low temperatures, but it becomes more reactive at higher temperatures. Therefore, a balance must be achieved between the low reactivity of nitrogen gas at low temperatures and the entropy driven formation of N2 at high temperatures. However, synthetic methods for nitrides are growing more sophisticated and the materials are of increasing technological relevance.

Uses of nitrides
Like carbides, nitrides are often refractory materials owing to their high lattice energy, which reflects the strong bonding of "N3−" to with metal cation(s). Thus, cubic boron nitride, titanium nitride, and silicon nitride are used as cutting materials and hard coatings. Hexagonal boron nitride, which adopts a layered structure, is a useful high-temperature lubricant akin to molybdenum disulfide. Nitride compounds often have large band gaps, thus nitrides are usually insulators or wide-bandgap semiconductors; examples include boron nitride and silicon nitride.  The wide-band gap material gallium nitride is prized for emitting blue light in LEDs.  Like some oxides, nitrides can absorb hydrogen and have been discussed in the context of hydrogen storage, e.g. lithium nitride.

Examples
Classification of such a varied group of compounds is somewhat arbitrary.  Compounds where nitrogen is not assigned −3 oxidation state are not included, such as nitrogen trichloride where the oxidation state is +3; nor are ammonia and its many organic derivatives.

Nitrides of the s-block elements
Sodium nitride and potassium nitride has been generated, but remains a laboratory curiosity. The nitrides of the alkaline earth metals that have the formula  are however numerous. Examples include beryllium nitride, magnesium nitride, calcium nitride, and strontium nitride. The nitrides of electropositive metals (including Li, Zn, and the alkaline earth metals) readily hydrolyze upon contact with water, including the moisture in the air:

Nitrides of the p-block elements
Boron nitride exists as several forms (polymorphs). Nitrides of silicon and phosphorus are also known, but only the former is commercially important. The nitrides of aluminium, gallium, and indium adopt diamond-like wurtzite structure in which each atom occupies tetrahedral sites. For example, in aluminium nitride, each aluminium atom has four neighboring nitrogen atoms at the corners of a tetrahedron and similarly each nitrogen atom has four neighboring aluminium atoms at the corners of a tetrahedron. This structure is like hexagonal diamond (lonsdaleite) where every carbon atom occupies a tetrahedral site (however wurtzite differs from sphalerite and diamond in the relative orientation of tetrahedra). Thallium(I) nitride is known, but thallium(III) nitride (TlN) is not.

Transition metal nitrides

For the group 3 metals, ScN and YN are both known. Group 4, 5, and 6 transition metals (the titanium, vanadium and chromium groups) all form nitrides. They are refractory, with high melting point and are chemically stable.  Representative is titanium nitride. These materials often adopt the rocksalt crystal structure.

Nitrides of the group 7 and 8 transition metals tend to be nitrogen-poor, and decompose readily at elevated temperatures. For example, iron nitride,  decomposes at 200 °C. Sometimes these materials are called "interstitial nitrides". Platinum nitride and osmium nitride may contain  units, and as such should not be called nitrides.

Nitrides of heavier members from group 11 and 12 are less stable than copper nitride,  and zinc nitride: dry silver nitride is a contact explosive which may detonate from the slightest touch, even a falling water droplet.

Nitrides of the lanthanides and actinides
Nitride containing species of the lanthanides and actinides are of scientific interest as they can provide a useful handle for determining covalency of bonding.  Nuclear magnetic resonance (NMR) spectroscopy along with quantum chemical analysis has often been used to determine the degree to which metal nitride bonds are ionic or covalent in character. One example, a uranium nitride, has the highest known nitrogen-15 chemical shift.

Molecular nitrides

Many metals form molecular nitrido complexes, as discussed in the specialized article. The main group elements also form some molecular nitrides. Cyanogen and tetrasulfur tetranitride are rare examples of a molecular binary (containing one element aside from nitrogen) nitrides. They dissolve in nonpolar solvents.  Both undergo polymerization.   is also unstable with respect to the elements, but less so that the isostructural . Heating  gives a polymer, and a variety of molecular sulfur nitride anions and cations are also known.

Related to but distinct from nitride is pernitride diatomic anion and the azide triatomic anion (N3-).

References

Anions